The following lists events in the year 2018 in Belize.

Incumbents
 Monarch: Elizabeth II
 Prime Minister: Dean Barrow
 Governor-General: Colville Young

Events

Sports 
4 to 15 April – Belize competed at the 2018 Commonwealth Games  in the Gold Coast, Queensland, Australia.

Deaths

11 April – Phillip Pipersburg, Olympic sprinter (b. 1955).

References

 
2010s in Belize
Years of the 21st century in Belize
Belize
Belize